Dysschema porioni is a moth of the family Erebidae first described by Christian Gibeaux in 1982. It is found in Peru.

References

Moths described in 1982
Dysschema